Carmen is a 1918 German silent drama film directed by Ernst Lubitsch and starring Pola Negri, Harry Liedtke, and Leopold von Ledebur. It was based on the novella Carmen by Prosper Mérimée. Like Bizet's opera Carmen, this film only adapts the third part of Mérimée's novella and transforms the character of Don José at the beginning of the story from bandit on the run to honest man in love with his childhood sweetheart. The film was released  with English intertitles in the United States in 1921 under the alternative title Gypsy Blood.

Plot
The story is told by a man at a campfire who says that it took place many years before.

Don José was a Dragoon Sergeant in Sevilla who fell madly in love with Carmen, a beautiful gypsy. For her, he killed an officer and gave up his fiancée and his career in the army, and became a smuggler. But Carmen's love did not last. She left him and went to Gibraltar where she fell in love with the famous bullfighter Escamillo. Back in Sevilla, Carmen rode triumphantly in Escamillo's carriage on his way to a bullfight. At the end of the bullfight, José confronted Carmen and when she told him that she no longer loved him, stabbed her to death.

Back at the campfire seen at the beginning, the man who told the story adds that some say that Carmen did not die ′for she was in league with the Devil himself.'

Cast

References

Bibliography

External links
 
 Ernst Lubitsch: Der sanfte Orientalismus in CARMEN - Ewa Mazierska Deutsches Filmmuseum

1918 films
1918 drama films
Films of the Weimar Republic
German silent feature films
German drama films
Films based on Carmen
Films set in Seville
Films set in the 19th century
UFA GmbH films
Films directed by Ernst Lubitsch
German black-and-white films
Films about Romani people
Bullfighting films
Silent drama films
1910s German films